This is a discography for the Christian music vocal quartet The Imperials.

Albums
Source:   

*originally recorded in 1976

Compilations
1970: Believe It (Vista)
1972: The Imperials 1968–1972 (Impact/Benson)
1973: A Thing Called Love (Vista)
1977: The Best of the Imperials (Impact/Benson)
1979: The Imperials – Featuring Terry and Sherman (Impact/Benson)
1981: The Very Best of the Imperials (Dayspring/Word)
1982: First Day in Heaven (Impact/Benson)
1984: Give Them All to Jesus (Impact/Benson)
1986: Old Fashioned Faith (Dayspring/Word)
1989: 20 Favorites by the Imperials (Benson)
1992: Masters of Gospel (RiverSong/Benson)
1994: Treasures (StarSong)
1996: The Imperials – Legacy 1977–1988 (Word)
1998: Gospel Music Hall of Fame 1964–1976 (Benson)
2006: The Imperials – Classic Hits (New Haven/Provident)
2007: The Definitive Collection (Word/Warner)
2014: The Ultimate Collection (Word/Curb)

Elvis Presley with The Imperials (complete albums)

1966: How Great Thou Art (RCA)
1969: From Memphis to Vegas/From Vegas to Memphis (Elvis in Person at the International Hotel) (RCA)

1970: Live at the International Hotel, Las Vegas, NV August 26, 1969 (RCA)
1970: On Stage (RCA)
1970: That's the Way It Is (RCA)
1971: Elvis Country (I'm 10,000 Years Old) (RCA)
1971: Love Letters from Elvis (RCA)
1971: Elvis Sings The Wonderful World of Christmas (RCA)
1972: Elvis Now (RCA)
1972: He Touched Me (RCA)
1973: Elvis (RCA)

Appearances on other albums
1964: The Best Of Heart Warming – various artists; "Lord, I Need You" (HeartWarming Records)
1965: Dottie Rambo and The Imperials (HeartWarming Records)
1965:  A Man Named Smith  – Fred Smith and Jake Hess & The Imperials (Impact Records)
1965:  Bill Sings the Old Favorites  – Bill Gober and Jake Hess & The Imperials (HeartWarming Records)
1966: The Gloryland Way – Hank Locklin (RCA Victor)
1966:  Sings Great Sacred Songs  – Connie Smith and Jake Hess & The Imperials (RCA Viktor)
1966:  Gospel Train  – Hank Snow and Jake Hess & The Imperials (RCA Viktor)
1967:  Christmas with Hank Snow  – Hank Snow and Jake Hess & The Imperials (RCA Viktor)
1967:  Most Richly Blessed  – Jimmy Dean and Jake Hess & The Imperials (RCA Viktor)
1967: Doug Oldham with Jake Hess and the Imperials sing 12 Songs by Bill Gaither (HeartWarming)
1971: Here's to Veterans 99 – The Imperials (Program No. 1276) / Wilma Burgess (The Veterans Administration)
1975: Christmas at Our House – various artists; "Infant Holy" (Impact)
1976: Doug Oldham and Friends; with the Imperials on "I've Got Something to Sing About" (Impact)
1976: The Name of Jesus – Jimmy Swaggart (JIM Records)
1976: Only Jesus – Jimmy Swaggart (JIM Records)
1984: The Praise in Us: A Word Family Praise Album – various artists; "The Praise In Us" (Word Records)
1985: The Continental Singers – Together We Stand; "Who Will Save the Children?" (Music Mercy)

1988: Shake: Christian Artists Face the Music; a non-music album of interviews with various artists (Myrrh)

1989: Love Is You to Me – Kim Boyce; with the Imperials on the title song (Myrrh)
1990: Handel's Young Messiah; "O Thou That Tellest Good Tidings to Zion" (Sony)
1992: A Few Good Men – Gaither Vocal Band (title song) (Star Song)
1996: The Greatest Gift – various artists; "Let's Go To Bethlehem" (Wright Music)
2003: The Gospel Side of Elvis – The Stamps and The Imperials (Armond, Jim, Terry & Sherman) (Double CD) (Gold Street Records)

Singles

Video
1970: Elvis: That's the Way It Is (MGM) (Armond, Jim, Joe, Terry & Roger)
1984: The Imperials 20th Anniversary (Myrrh/Word) (Armond, Jim, Dave & Paul)
2003: Elvis Lives 25th Anniversary Concert (Armond, Jim, Joe, Terry, Roger & Sherman)
2010: Still Standing (CMD Distribution) (Armond, Dave, Paul & Rick)

References

External links

Discographies of American artists
Christian music discographies